Lara Stanisława Mullen is a British fashion model.

Early life 
Mullen is of maternal Polish descent. She is Catholic.

Career 
Mullen was discovered at Underage Festival in Victoria Park, London; weeks later she debuted at Alexander Wang and walked for designers including Vera Wang, Topshop, Acne Studios, Jonathan Saunders, Dries van Noten, and Prada as an exclusive (considered the highest feat for a model). In Paris, she walked for Givenchy, Céline, and Chloé. In her career, she has also walked for Rag & Bone, Prabal Gurung, Tommy Hilfiger, Marc Jacobs, Rodarte, Calvin Klein, Marchesa, Oscar de la Renta, Mulberry, Versace, Roland Mouret, Roberto Cavalli, Fendi, Balmain, Gareth Pugh, Louis Vuitton, Valentino, Dior, Hermès, Sonia Rykiel, DKNY, John Galliano, Dolce & Gabbana, Kenzo, Missoni, Rick Owens, Burberry, Giorgio Armani, Nina Ricci, Proenza Schouler, Giambattista Valli, Joseph, Lacoste, Burberry, Erdem, and Mary Katrantzou among others.

Mullen has been on the cover of Dazed, i-D, and Vogue China.

In 2019, she was nominated for models.com's "Comeback of the Year" award, and is currently ranked as an "Industry Icon".

References 

1994 births
Living people
English female models
People from Northamptonshire
English people of Polish descent
English Roman Catholics
Prada exclusive models